Larry John Edgell (born November 16, 1946) is a former Democratic member of the West Virginia Senate, representing the 2nd district from 1998 to 2014. He was the President Pro Tempore of the Senate. Senator Edgell is a retired teacher. He and his wife Cecilia have two children: Eva and Josh. Edgell resides in New Martinsville, West Virginia.

Electoral history

References

External links
West Virginia Legislature - Senator Larry J. Edgell official government website
Project Vote Smart - Senator Larry J. Edgell (WV) profile
Follow the Money - Larry J. Edgell
2008 2006 2004 2002 1998 Senate campaign contributions

Democratic Party West Virginia state senators
1946 births
Living people
Educators from West Virginia
People from Hundred, West Virginia
Fairmont State University alumni
Salem International University alumni
21st-century American politicians
People from New Martinsville, West Virginia